The Producers Alliance for Cinema and Television (Pact) is the UK trade association for independent content producers in feature film, television, animation, children's and digital media.

Pact campaigns on issues of relevance to its members, including intellectual property, diversity (Pact's members are invited to sign a voluntary Diversity Pledge), and international issues.

As of 2023, the organisation's Chief Executive is John McVay.

References

External links

Arts and media trade groups
Film organisations in the United Kingdom
Trade associations based in the United Kingdom
Media and communications in the City of Westminster
Organisations based in the City of Westminster
Television organisations in the United Kingdom